Denil Omar Maldonado Munguía (born 26 May 1998) is a Honduran professional footballer who plays as a defender for Major League Soccer club Los Angeles FC, on loan from Motagua, and the Honduras national team.

Club career

Motagua
Maldonado started his professional career with F.C. Motagua under the management of Diego Vásquez. He made his debut on 6 September 2015, in a 4–2 home defeat to Real Sociedad. He scored his first goal on 2 December 2018 in the Apertura tournament semi-final against Platense.

Pachuca
On 19 January 2020, Maldonado joined Liga MX club Pachuca on a year–long loan, with an option to buy once six months had passed. He made his debut the following 28 January in a 3–1 (4–2 on aggregate) round of 16 win against Venados in the Copa MX.

Everton
On 9 September, Maldonado was loaned out to Chilean Primera División side Everton de Viña del Mar for six months after Pachuca and Motagua agreed to extend Maldonado's loan until July 2021. He didn't make his first appearance until the following 10 December, coming off the bench in a 3–1 home victory against Curicó Unido. He scored his first and only goal for Everton on 21 October 2021, the equalizer in a 1–1 draw with Ñublense.

Los Angeles FC
On 22 December 2022, Maldonado joined MLS side Los Angeles FC for the 2023 season on loan with an option to buy.

International career

Under-17
Maldonado represented Honduras at the 2015 FIFA U-17 World Cup in Chile.

Under-20
Maldonado played with the Honduras U-20 at the 2018 Central American and Caribbean Games in Colombia. He played in all five games and scored a goal against Trinidad and Tobago.

Under 23
On 23 July 2019, Maldonado was selected to represent Honduras at the 2019 Pan American Games in Lima, Peru. He captained the team throughout the tournament and sent Honduras to the final after converting the decisive penalty in a penalty shoot-out against Mexico. He played in the gold medal match as Honduras lost 4–1 to Argentina.

Senior
He made his debut for senior national team on 5 September 2019 in a friendly against Puerto Rico, as a starter.

Personal life
On 14 February 2017, his older brother Alex Maldonado was murdered inside a public transit bus in Tegucigalpa.

Career statistics

Club

International

Honours
Motagua
Liga Nacional: 2016–17 A, 2016–17 C, 2018–19 A, 2018–19 C, 2021–22 C
Honduran Supercup: 2017

Honduras U23
 Pan American Silver Medal: 2019

Individual
CONCACAF Men's Olympic Qualifying Tournament Best XI: 2020

References

External links

 
Pachuca official profile

1998 births
Living people
Association football defenders
Honduran footballers
Honduras international footballers
F.C. Motagua players
C.F. Pachuca players
Everton de Viña del Mar footballers
Los Angeles FC players
Liga Nacional de Fútbol Profesional de Honduras players
Liga MX players
Chilean Primera División players
Sportspeople from Tegucigalpa
Honduran expatriate footballers
Expatriate footballers in Mexico
Expatriate footballers in Chile
Honduran expatriate sportspeople in Mexico
Honduran expatriate sportspeople in Chile
Central American Games gold medalists for Honduras
Central American Games medalists in football
Pan American Games medalists in football
Pan American Games silver medalists for Honduras
Footballers at the 2019 Pan American Games
Honduras youth international footballers
Medalists at the 2019 Pan American Games
Honduras under-20 international footballers
Footballers at the 2020 Summer Olympics
Olympic footballers of Honduras